Khedrup Gelek Pelzang, 1st Panchen Lama (1385–1438 CE) – better known as Khedrup Je –  was one of the main disciples of Je Tsongkhapa, whose reforms to Atiśa's Kadam tradition are considered the beginnings of the Gelug school of Tibetan Buddhism.

Khedrub Je is considered to be an emanation of Manjusri, the Buddha of Wisdom.

Recognition
Khedrub Je was posthumously decided by the 5th Dalai Lama to have been a previous incarnation of Lobsang Chökyi Gyaltsen, 4th Panchen Lama (1570–1662).  Like all the Panchen Lamas, he is considered to be an incarnation of Amitābha Buddha. Traditionally, there were considered to be four Indian and three Tibetan incarnations before Khedrup, starting with Subhuti, one of the original disciples of Gautama Buddha.

According to the legend, after Tsongkhapa died in 1419, his disciple Khedrub Jey on five occasions met with him in mystical states. Kedrub Jey is most remembered for his charisma as a teacher, as well as for the many excellent commentaries that he wrote on the tantric lineages which Tsongkhapa gathered together and elucidated. He played an important role in the education of the First Dalai Lama, who was the youngest of Tsongkhapa's five chief disciples.

Background

Before becoming Tsongkhapa's foremost disciple, Khedrup Je had been a learned Sakya scholar.

Writings
Altogether, Khedrub Je's collected works total nine volumes in all, comprising a total of fifty-eight treatises. He also wrote many prayer books.

Kalachakra
Khedrub Je wrote an important text on Kalachakra that is still used by the current 14th Dalai Lama, as the basis for his public empowerments into the practice of the Kalachakra Tantra.

Mahamudra
Khedrub Je also wrote a root text on mahamudra.

Monastic career

Khedrup Je was unanimously chosen as Ganden Monastery's third abbot (after Tsongkhapa and Gyaltsab Je) by its monks, and also became the Ganden Tripa, the leader of the Gelug tradition.  He also founded Palcho Monastery in Gyantse in 1418 as well as the large Riwo Chöling Monastery in the Yarlung Valley, which is now just a heap of ruins.

Footnotes

References
 Das, Sarat Chandra. (1970) Contributions on the Religion and History of Tibet (1970). Manjushri Publishing House, New Delhi. First published in the Journal of the Asiatic Society of Bengal, Vol. LI (1882)
 Dorje, Gyurme (1999). Footprint Tibet Handbook with Bhutan. Footprint Handbooks, Bath, England. .
 Hilton, Isabel. (1999). The Search for the Panchen Lama. Viking. Reprint: Penguin Books. (2000), p. 58. .
 Stein, R. A. Tibetan Civilization, (1972). Stanford University Press, Stanford, California.  (cloth); .

Further reading
 The Great Seal of Voidness: The Root Text for the Ge-lug/Ka-gyu Tradition of Mahamudra. The Main Path All Buddhas Have Travelled (dGe-ldan bkah-brgyud rin-po-chehi phyag-chen rtza-ba rg yal-bahi gzhung-lam). (1975) Geshe Ngawang Dhargyey et al. Library of Tibetan Works and Archives. Dharamsala, H.P., India.

External links

 The Gelug-Kagyu Tradition of Mahamudra: complete online edition of book by 14th Dalai Lama and Alexander Berzin first published as The Gelug/Kagyü Tradition of Mahamudra (Ithaca, Snow Lion, 1997), comprising Khedrub Je's root text, autocommentary, and discourses on both.

1385 births
1438 deaths
Ganden Tripas
Panchen Lama 01
14th-century Tibetan people
15th-century Tibetan people